Abelardo Castillo (March 27, 1935 – May 2, 2017) was an Argentine writer, novelist, essayist, diarist, born in the city of San Pedro, Buenos Aires. He practised amateur boxing in his youth. He also directed the literary magazines El Escarabajo de Oro and El Ornitorrinco. He is well regarded in the field of Latin American literature. In 2014 he won the Diamond Konex Award as the best writer in the last decade in Argentina.

Works 

Antología personal (1999) 
La casa de ceniza (1967)
La casa de ceniza (1994) 
Crónica de un iniciado (1991) 
El cruce del Aqueronte (1982)
Cuentos crueles (1966)
Cuentos crueles (1982) 
El que tiene sed (1989) 
El Evangelio según Van Hutten (1999) 
Israfel (2001) 
Israfel, drama en dos actos y dos tabernas sobre la vida de Edgar Poe (1964)
Las maquinarias de la noche (1992) 
Los mundos reales V : el espejo que tiemblo (2005) 
El oficio de mentir : conversaciones con María Fasce (1998) 
Las otras puertas; [cuentos] (1961)
Las otras puertas, y otros cuentos (1972)
El otro Judas; o, El pájaro mágico (1961)
Las palabras y los días (1988) 
Las panteras y el templo (1976)
El que tiene sed (1985) 
Ser escritor (1997) 
Teatro completo (1995) 
Teatro: Sobre las piedras de Jericó. A partir de las 7. El otro Judas (1968)
Cuentos brutales with Rodolfo Walsh and Luisa Valenzuela (1997)

External links

 Biographical details, literatura.org 

1935 births
2017 deaths
People from Buenos Aires Province
Argentine male writers
Argentine diarists